Colocleora is a genus of moths in the family Geometridae. It was described by Louis Beethoven Prout in 1938.

Species
Some species of this genus are:

Colocleora abdicata Herbulot, 1975
Colocleora acharis Herbulot, 1962
Colocleora albicurvata (Bastelberger, 1909)
Colocleora anisoscia Prout, 1938
Colocleora ankoleensis Carcasson, 1965
Colocleora ansorgei (Warren, 1901)
Colocleora bellula Prout, 1938
Colocleora bergeri Herbulot, 1975
Colocleora bilobata Herbulot, 1975
Colocleora binoti Herbulot, 1983
Colocleora bipannosa Prout, 1938
Colocleora burgeoni (Prout, 1934)
Colocleora calcarata Herbulot, 1972
Colocleora catalai Prout, 1938
Colocleora cellularis Herbulot, 1973
Colocleora chrysomelas Viette, 1975
Colocleora cinnamomoneura Prout, 1938
Colocleora clarivenata (Prout, 1918)
Colocleora clio Viette, 1974
Colocleora collenettei Prout, 1938
Colocleora comoraria (Oberthür, 1913)
Colocleora delos Viette, 1974
Colocleora derennei Herbulot, 1975
Colocleora dichroma Herbulot, 1978
Colocleora disgrega Prout, 1938
Colocleora divisaria (Walker, 1860)
Colocleora ducleri Herbulot, 1983
Colocleora erato Viette, 1974
Colocleora euplates (Prout, 1925)
Colocleora euterpe Viette, 1974
Colocleora expansa (Warren, 1899)
Colocleora faceta (Prout, 1934)
Colocleora grisea (Janse, 1932)
Colocleora hegemonica (Prout, 1932)
Colocleora herbuloti Viette, 1974
Colocleora inaequivalis Herbulot, 1987
Colocleora indivisa (Prout, 1927)
Colocleora ingloriosa Herbulot, 1997
Colocleora lambillioni Herbulot, 1975
Colocleora leucostephana Prout, 1938
Colocleora linearis Herbulot, 1985
Colocleora malvina Herbulot, 1982
Colocleora melancheima Prout, 1938
Colocleora monogrammaria (Mabille, 1890)
Colocleora nampouinei Viette, 1974
Colocleora oncera Prout, 1938
Colocleora opisthommata Prout, 1938
Colocleora orthogonalis Viette, 1974
Colocleora perpectinata Prout, 1938
Colocleora poliophasma D. S. Fletcher, 1958
Colocleora polyplanes Prout, 1938
Colocleora polysemna Prout, 1938
Colocleora potaenia (Prout, 1915)
Colocleora probola Prout, 1938
Colocleora prona Prout, 1938
Colocleora proximaria (Walker, 1860)
Colocleora ramosa Herbulot, 1973
Colocleora refulgens (Herbulot, 1965)
Colocleora sanghana Herbulot, 1985
Colocleora sciabola Prout, 1938
Colocleora simulatrix (Warren, 1899)
Colocleora smithi (Warren, 1904)
Colocleora splendens Herbulot, 1954
Colocleora spuria (Prout, 1915)
Colocleora suffumosa Prout, 1938
Colocleora thalie Viette, 1974
Colocleora turlini Herbulot, 1982
Colocleora umbrata Prout, 1938

References

 
 

Boarmiini
Geometridae genera